Asaccus iranicus is a species of lizard in the family Phyllodactylidae. It is endemic to Iran.

References

Asaccus
Reptiles of Iran
Endemic fauna of Iran
Reptiles described in 2011